Afrim is an Albanian male given name.

Notable people with this name include:
 Afrim Bilali, Albanian basketball player
 Afrim Kuci, Kosovar football player
 Afrim Taku, Albanian football player
 Afrim Tole (born 1970), Albanian football player 
 Afrim Tovërlani, Kosovar football player

See also
 AFRIMS, Armed Forces Research Institute of Medical Sciences